Büchler or  Buechler is a German surname.  Notable people with the surname include:

 Adolf Büchler (1867–1939), Austro-Hungarian rabbi, historian and theologian
 Heinrich Bichler (also Hans Bichler, Heinrich Büchler or Hans Büchler), Swiss painter
 Jean-Pierre Büchler (1908–1993), Luxembourgian politician
 John Carl Buechler (1952–2019), American director, actor, and special effects and makeup artist
 Jud Buechler (born 1968), American professional basketball player
 Markus Büchler (born 1955), German surgeon and university professor
 Nicole Büchler (born 1983), Swiss pole vaulter
 Sándor Büchler (1869–1944), Hungarian rabbi and educator

See also
 Buchler

German-language surnames